Hawks are medium-large sized predatory birds.

Hawks may also refer to:

 Hawks (surname)
 Hawks (film), a film starring Timothy Dalton
 Hawks (South Africa), an anti-corruption unit of the South African Police Service
 Hawks, Ohio, a community in the United States
 The Hawks, a band that became The Band
 Bill Hawks, a character on Wagon Train, played by Terry Wilson
 Hawks (band) a band from the Otho/Fort Dodge Iowa area
 Hawks, the hero name for the character Keigo Takami from the anime series My Hero Academia

Sport
 Atlanta Hawks, an NBA basketball team from Atlanta, Georgia, U.S.
 Fukuoka SoftBank Hawks, a Japanese baseball team
 Hanau Hawks, a defunct American football club from Hanau, Germany
 Hawke's Bay Hawks, a New Zealand basketball team
 Hawks' Club, a social club for sportsmen of the University of Cambridge
 Hawks F.C., a 19th-century amateur football club in England
 Hawks FC, a football club in Gambia 
 Hawthorn Hawks, an Australian Football League team
 Hunslet Hawks, the former name of an English rugby league team
 Illawarra Hawks, an Australian basketball team competing in the National Basketball League
 Järvenpää Hawks, a Finnish ice hockey team
 Maryland Eastern Shore Hawks, the collegiate athletic program of the University of Maryland Eastern Shore
 Saint Joseph's Hawks, the collegiate athletic program of Saint Joseph's University in Philadelphia
 Seattle Seahawks, a National Football League team
 University of Iowa Hawkeyes, an American collegiate athletics team that participates in multiple sporting events
 A nickname for the Chicago Blackhawks of the NHL
 A nickname for the United States national rugby league team
 A nickname for Whitehawk F.C., a football club in Brighton, England

See also
Hawk (disambiguation)
Hawkes